The 2012–13 Texas Tech Red Raiders basketball team represented Texas Tech University in the 2012–13 NCAA Division I men's basketball season. The team, led by interim head coach Chris Walker, played its home games at the United Spirit Arena in Lubbock, Texas and were members of the Big 12 Conference. They finished the season 11–20, 3–15 in Big 12 play to finish in ninth place. They lost in the quarterfinals of the Big 12 tournament to Kansas.

Pre-season

Departures

In addition to departing players, Texas Tech came to the spotlight on Friday, September 7 when head coach Billy Gillispie was hospitalized for undisclosed medical reasons. That same day, Texas Tech officials announced that Gillispie was being investigated for possible player misconduct. Gillispie would be discharged from the hospital on Wednesday, September 5. A few days later, Monday, September 10, an ambulance was sent to the home of Gillispie. Gillispie was once again sent to the hospital for an undisclosed medical reason. On Thursday, September 13, Gillispie resigned as head coach of Texas Tech, citing he was leaving due to health reasons.

Recruits

Roster

Schedule

|-
!colspan=12 style="background:#000000; color:#CC0000;"| Exhibition

|-
!colspan=12 style="background:#CC0000; color:black;"| Non-Conference Regular Season

|-
!colspan=12 style="background:#CC0000; color:black;"| Big 12 Regular Season

|-
!colspan=12 style="background:#CC0000; color:black;"| 2013 Big 12 men's basketball tournament

References

External links
Official Texas Tech Red Raiders men's basketball page 

Texas Tech Red Raiders basketball seasons
Texas Tech
Texas Tech
Texas Tech